The committees of the Parliament of South Africa are composed of a few members of Parliament from the National Assembly, or permanent delegates from the National Council of Provinces, or a combination of both appointed to deal with particular areas or issues; mostly consists of members of the National Assembly. The majority of parliamentary committees are portfolio committees, which oversee departments and are found in the National Assembly. The area of responsibility of these committees differs depending on whether they are committees of the National Assembly or the National Council of Provinces.

National Assembly

Portfolio committees
The portfolio committees of the National Assembly deal with the examining of bills, departmental budget votes, and are responsible for oversight of the work their respective department does.

Standing committees

National Council of Provinces

Select committees
Select committees are made up of permanent delegates to the National Council of Provinces. Since the NCOP is much smaller than the National Assembly, select committees oversee the work of more than one department.

Joint committees

Joint committee
A joint committee consists of members of Parliament from both the National Assembly and the National Council of Provinces. There is currently only one.

Joint standing committees

See also
List of Commissions of Inquiry in South Africa

References

Parliament of South Africa
Committees of the Parliament of South Africa